Gerarctia is a monotypic moth genus of the family Noctuidae. Its only species, Gerarctia poliotis, is found in the Canary Islands. Both the genus and species were first described by George Hampson in 1905.

References

Acontiinae
Monotypic moth genera